Plesiotrochus monachus is a species of sea snail, a marine gastropod mollusk in the family Plesiotrochidae.

Distribution 
This species occurs from New South Wales to Fremantle, Australia.

References 

Plesiotrochidae
Gastropods of Australia